The Hauto Tunnel, dug in 1871–72, was a  single-track railway tunnel crossing under the barrier ridge of Nesquehoning Mountain between Lansford, Pennsylvania, in the Panther Creek Valley and the Central Railroad of New Jersey trackage near the dam of the Hauto Reservoir impoundment about  above Nesquehoning, Pennsylvania.

Built as a joint venture by the Central Railroad of New Jersey and landlords Lehigh Coal & Navigation Company (LC&N Co.) shortly after the LC&N board of directors had decided to opt out of the rail transportation business and leased all the railroads it owned or controlled under subsidiary Lehigh & Susquehanna Railroad to the CNJ.  The tunnel began as a notion when LC&N Co. miners needed to drain water from a higher mine gallery under the Panther Creek Valley and so dug a drainage shaft from the other (north) side of Nesquehoning Ridge into the coal beds under Lansford.

Once the tracks were in operation and proven, the tunnel allowed the CNJ to seek permission from LC&N Co. to cease coal shipments to the canal head on the iconic Summit Hill & Mauch Chunk Railroad, and to sell off the asset as a common carrier and tourist railway.

See also
 Lehigh Canal
 Lehigh Coal & Navigation Company
 Lehigh & Susquehanna Railroad
 Panther Creek Valley
 Summit Hill & Mauch Chunk Railroad

Notes

References

History of Carbon County, Pennsylvania
Railroad tunnels in Pennsylvania
Central Railroad of New Jersey
Transportation buildings and structures in Carbon County, Pennsylvania